Stroking the Moon  is the third album by the San Francisco-based alternative rock band Deadweight. Although instrumentation is violin and cello they are often electronically effected and some tracks are heavy metal.

Musicians 
Paulo Baldi - percussion, background vocals
Ben Barnes - vocals, violin
Sam Bass - cello

Track listing 
"Re-runs"
"The Bottle Song"
"Capacity"
"Stare At The Sun"
"Anesthesia"
"Deja Vu"
"Stroking The Moon"
"Feed The Ground"
"Heaven's For Few"
"Go To Hell"

References 

liner notes

2003 albums
Deadweight (band) albums